The Texas Rangers 1989 season involved the Rangers finishing fourth in the American League West with a record of 83 wins and 79 losses.

This season, the Rangers were sold to a new ownership group; the managing partner was future United States President George W. Bush.

Offseason
 October 11, 1988: Guy Hoffman was released by the Rangers.
 December 5, 1988: Paul Kilgus, Mitch Williams, Curtis Wilkerson, Steve Wilson, Luis Benitez (minors) and Pablo Delgado (minors) were traded by the Rangers to the Chicago Cubs in exchange for Rafael Palmeiro, Jamie Moyer and Drew Hall.
December 5, 1988: Bobby Meacham was traded by the New York Yankees to the Texas Rangers for Bob Brower.
 December 6, 1988: Pete O'Brien, Oddibe McDowell, and Jerry Browne were traded by the Rangers to the Cleveland Indians for Julio Franco.
 December 7, 1988: Nolan Ryan was signed as a free agent by the Rangers.
 January 6, 1989: Cecilio Guante was signed as a free agent by the Rangers.
 January 6, 1989: Jim Sundberg was signed as a free agent by the Rangers.
 January 23, 1989: Rick Leach was signed as a free agent by the Rangers.

Regular season
 June 16, 1989: Sammy Sosa made his major league debut in a game against the New York Yankees. In four at-bats, Sosa appeared in 4 at-bats and had 2 hits.
 August 22, 1989: Against the eventual World Champion Oakland A's, Ryan became the first pitcher ever to record 5,000 career strikeouts. He struck out Rickey Henderson in the fifth inning to break the 5,000 barrier.
 September 12, 1989: Nolan Ryan threw 164 pitches before he was replaced on the mound by Kenny Rogers in the ninth inning. The Rangers lost the game, 6–5, to the Kansas City Royals.
 Rubén Sierra had a career year as he led the AL in triples and RBI but ranked 6th in home runs (29), third in runs scored (101) and 5th in hits (194). He set the club record for most total bases in a season (344), which also led the league.

Season standings

Record vs. opponents

Notable transactions
 July 29, 1989: Sammy Sosa, Wilson Álvarez, and Scott Fletcher were traded by the Rangers to the Chicago White Sox for Harold Baines and Fred Manrique.

Roster

Player stats

Batting

Starters by position
Note: Pos = Position; G = Games played; AB = At bats; H = Hits; Avg. = Batting average; HR = Home runs; RBI = Runs batted in

Other batters
Note: G = Games played; AB = At bats; H = Hits; Avg. = Batting average; HR = Home runs; RBI = Runs batted in

Pitching

Starting pitchers 
Note: G = Games pitched; IP = Innings pitched; W = Wins; L = Losses; ERA = Earned run average; SO = Strikeouts

Other pitchers 
Note: G = Games pitched; IP = Innings pitched; W = Wins; L = Losses; ERA = Earned run average; SO = Strikeouts

Relief pitchers 
Note: G = Games pitched; W = Wins; L = Losses; SV = Saves; ERA = Earned run average; SO = Strikeouts

Awards and honors
 Julio Franco, Silver Slugger Award, 1989
 Jeff Russell, Rolaids Relief Man of the Year Award 1989
 Nolan Ryan, American League Leader Strikeouts (301)
 Rubén Sierra, Silver Slugger Award, 1989
 Rubén Sierra, American League Leader, Triples (14)
 Rubén Sierra, American League Leader, RBI (119)
 Rubén Sierra, American League Leader, Total Bases (344)

All-Star Game
 Julio Franco, second baseman, starter
 Rubén Sierra, outfield, starter
 Nolan Ryan, pitcher, reserve
 Jeff Russell, relief pitcher, reserve

Farm system 

LEAGUE CHAMPIONS: Charlotte

References

1989 Texas Rangers at Baseball Reference
1989 Texas Rangers at Baseball Almanac

Texas Rangers seasons
Texas Rangers seasons
1989 in sports in Texas